inter alia means "among other things"

Inter Alia may refer to:
Inter Alia (law journal)
In•ter a•li•a, At the Drive-In album, 2017
Inter Alia, 1997 album by Marcus Johnson